The Supernatural Now Tour was a concert tour by American rock band Santana, commemorating the 20th anniversary of their pivotal 1999 album Supernatural and their appearance at the Woodstock festival in 1969. The tour also supports their most recent album, Africa Speaks.

Overview 
The Supernatural Now Tour consisted of 33 performances across the United States and Canada. The tour was announced on January 16, 2019, and each show was opened by the Doobie Brothers (with the exception of the final show). During the tour, the group headlined Bethel, New York's half-centennial celebration of Woodstock at Bethel Woods Center for the Arts in August 2019.

Tour band 
 Ray Greene – lead vocals
 Andy Vargas – lead vocals
 Carlos Santana – lead guitar, percussion, vocals
 Tommy Anthony – rhythm guitar, vocals
 David K. Mathews – keyboards
 Benny Rietveld – bass guitar
 Cindy Blackman Santana – drums
 Paoli Mejías – percussion
 Karl Perazzo – timbales, percussion, vocals

Set list 
An average set list of this tour is as follows:

 "Soul Sacrifice" (Carlos Santana, Gregg Rolie, David Brown, Marcus Malone)
 "Jin-go-lo-ba" (Babatunde Olatunji)
 "Evil Ways" (Clarence "Sonny" Henry)
 "A Love Supreme" (John Coltrane)
 "(Da Le) Yaleo" (Santana, Shakara Mutela, Christian Polloni)
 "Put Your Lights On" (Erik Schrody)
 "Hope You're Feeling Better" (Rolie)
 "Black Magic Woman" (Peter Green)
 "Gypsy Queen" (Gábor Szabó)
 "Oye Como Va" (Tito Puente)
 "Love of My Life" (Santana, Dave Matthews)
 "Breaking Down the Door" (Santana, Manu Chao, Concha Buika, Drew Gonsalves, Ivan Duran, Rafael de Leon)
 "The Game of Love" (Gregg Alexander, Rick Nowels)
 "The Calling" (Santana, Chester D. Thompson, Freddie Stone, Linda Graham)
 "Maria Maria" (Santana, Karl Perazzo, Raul Rekow, Wyclef Jean, Jerry Duplessis)
 "Foo Foo" (Yvon André, Roger Eugène, Yves Joseph, Hermann Nau, Claude Jean)
 "Corazón Espinado" (Fher Olvera)
 "Toussaint L'Overture" (José Areas, Brown, Michael Carabello, Rolie, Michael Shrieve, Santana)
Encore
 "Are You Ready" (Joe Chambers)
 "Smooth" (Itaal Shur, Rob Thomas)
 "Love, Peace And Happiness" (The Chambers Brothers)

Tour dates

References

External links 
 Santana Past Shows 2019 at Santana official website

Santana (band) concert tours
2019 concert tours
Concert tours of North America